Danamandıra Nature Park is a nature park in Silivri district of Istanbul Province, Turkey.

The forest area with lakes in it located just southwest of Danamandıra village in Silivri district in the European side of Istanbul Province was registered in 2006 as a protected area for conservation of nature. On 16 December 2015, the recreational area was established as a nature park featuring three  lakes, with reed covered shore.

In 2016, the nature park was leased by the municipality of the neighboring district Esenyurt for 49 years in order to provide recreation area for its residents, who live in a crowded district. The opening took place in mid May that year.

A fee for vehicles is charged at the park entrance.

References

Nature parks in Turkey
Protected areas established in 2015
2015 establishments in Turkey
Parks in Istanbul
Silivri
Tourist attractions in Istanbul Province
Esenyurt